was a town located in Saihaku District, Tottori Prefecture, Japan.

As of 2003, the town had an estimated population of 8,852 and a density of 343.10 persons per km². The total area was 25.80 km².

On March 31, 2005, Yodoe was merged into the expanded city of Yonago.

External links
 Yonago official website 

Dissolved municipalities of Tottori Prefecture
Yonago, Tottori